The Hythe is an area in the southeastern part of Colchester in Essex, England, on the River Colne. Historically it was a hamlet. The Hythe is home to the Paxmans Factory which manufactures automobile parts.

Hythe railway station is on the Sunshine Coast Line. Services run towards Clacton-on-sea, Walton-on-the-Naze, Colchester and London.

The Church of St Leonard is located in the Hythe.

References

Hamlets in Essex
Colchester (town)
History of Colchester